"Liar" is a number-one R&B single by group Profyle. The hit song spent one week at number-one on the US R&B chart and peaked at number fourteen on the US Pop chart.

Music video
Directed by Terry Heller, the video features one of the band members following his girlfriend to find out that she cheated on him with another man from the streets. He surprises her when she sees her stuff outside of his home and gives him a "one-way" ticket as she sees him with a new woman holding a dog.

Formats and track listing
US 12"
"Liar" (Main) – 4:59
"Liar" (Radio) – 4:00
"Liar" (Acappella) – 4:49
"Liar" (Instrumental) – 4:59

US CD Maxi-Single
"Liar" (Radio Edit) – 4:00
"Liar" (Instrumental) – 4:59
"Can We Talk (About Us)" – 1:34
"(Can We) M.A.K.E. L.U.V" – 1:22
"Damn" – 0:55
"Nasty" – 1:22
"I Do" – 1:28
"One Night" – 1:49

Charts

Weekly charts

Year-end charts

See also
 List of number-one R&B singles of 2000 (U.S.)

References

2000 singles
2000 songs
Song recordings produced by Teddy Riley
Songs written by Roy "Royalty" Hamilton